Trial races for the Epsom Oaks are horse races during April and May which are contested by three-year-old fillies likely to run in The Oaks in early June.

The leading trial of recent years has been the 1,000 Guineas Stakes, which has been contested by eight subsequent winners of the Oaks in the last twenty-five years. The following table shows races classed at Listed level or above which served as a trial for an Oaks winner during the period 1992 to 2018.

 The Height of Fashion Stakes was known as the Lupe Stakes before 2007.

2012 Oaks contenders
Notable early-season appearances by horses which ran in the 2012 Oaks.

 Betterbetterbetter: 2nd Cheshire Oaks
 Colima: 2nd Lingfield Oaks Trial
 Coquet: 1st Height of Fashion Stakes
 Devotion: 2nd Derrinstown Stud 1,000 Guineas Trial
 Kailani: 1st Pretty Polly Stakes
 Maybe: 3rd 1,000 Guineas Stakes
 Nayarra: 2nd Nell Gwyn Stakes, 9th 1,000 Guineas Stakes, 4th Height of Fashion Stakes
 Shirocco Star: 2nd Fillies' Trial Stakes
 The Fugue: 4th 1,000 Guineas Stakes, 1st Musidora Stakes
 Twirl: 2nd Park Express Stakes, 2nd Musidora Stakes
 Vow: 1st Lingfield Oaks Trial
 Was (winner): 3rd Blue Wind Stakes

See also
 Trial races for the Epsom Derby

References
 Racing Post race records of the last twenty-one Oaks winners:
 1992, 1993, 1994, 1995, 1996, 1997, 1998, 1999, 2000, 2001
 2002, 2003, 2004, 2005, 2006, 2007, 2008, 2009, 2010, 2011, 2012